Paco Lopez or Paco López may refer to:

Paco López (footballer) (born 1967), Spanish football manager and former player
Paco Lopez (jockey) (born 1985), Mexican-born American jockey